Leipziger Ballspiel-Club was a German association football club from Leipzig, Saxony.

History
Founded on 6 March 1893 in the Keglerheim (Nordstraße) as a football and cricket club at the instigation of a group of three Englishmen, it is notable as a founding member of the DFB (Deutscher Fußball Bund or German Football Association) at Leipzig in 1900 where it was represented by Oskar Büttner.

Prior to this LBC played a prominent role in the formation of Verband Leipziger Ballspiel-Vereine in 1896 with Büttner serving as the city league's first president. This circuit was part of the larger regional Verbande Mitteldeutscher Ballspiel-Vereine (Federation of Central German Ballgame Associations).

The footballers played in the city's Sportplatz in white-and-yellow vertically striped jerseys and dark-blue shorts. They generally earned lower-to-mid-table results, with their best finish coming in 1907–08 when they appeared in the city final, losing 1:6 to VfB Leipzig. VfB also notes in their history that their first ever match was a victory over LBC (3:1) on 5 July 1896. After a long string of poor finishes LBC slipped to lower-tier play in the mid-1920s before disappearing towards the end of World War II.

The association also had a tennis department.

External links
Leipziger Fußball Verband

Defunct football clubs in Germany
Defunct football clubs in Saxony
Association football clubs established in 1893
Sport in Leipzig
1893 establishments in Germany
Football clubs in Germany